Cupulina is an extinct genus of sea sponges belonging to the class Demospongiae.

References

See also List of prehistoric sponge genera

Tetractinomorpha
Prehistoric sponge genera